Samuel "Sam" Lucente (born 1958) is a designer. He has worked at various technology companies.

Education 
Lucente studied at the University of Cincinnati.

Career 
He worked for IBM between 1981 and 1996. He was responsible for the design of computers, including the Leapfrog computer and the IBM ThinkPad 701, along with Richard Sapper  . , which is part of the collection of his work at Museum of Modern Art. From 1996 until 1998 he worked at Netscape. From 2003 until 2010 he was the VP of design at Hewlett Packard. At HP, he proposed using a single logo on their products to save costs. He has been a witness in the Apple v Samsung lawsuit.

Recognition 
Lucente has received various awards.

References

External links 
 https://www.wired.com/1994/04/dreamware/
 http://mbc.mmm.northwestern.edu/2008/Keynotes.html
 https://www.wsj.com/articles/SB109052778547671386
 https://www.moma.org/artists/6612
 mention in Book about Lucente

American industrial designers
1958 births
Living people